3(or 17)alpha-hydroxysteroid dehydrogenase (3(17)alpha-hydroxysteroid dehydrogenase) is an enzyme with systematic name 3(or 17)alpha-hydroxysteroid:NAD(P)+ oxidoreductase. This enzyme catalyses the chemical reaction

 androsterone + NAD(P)+  5alpha-androstane-3,17-dione + NAD(P)H + H+

This enzyme acts on the 3alpha-hydroxy group of androgens of the 5alpha-androstane series; and also, more slowly, on the 17alpha-hydroxy group of both androgenic and estrogenic substrates (cf. EC 1.1.1.51 3(or 17)beta-hydroxysteroid dehydrogenase).

References

External links 
 

EC 1.1.1
NADH-dependent enzymes
NADPH-dependent enzymes
Enzymes of known structure